WSU Press may refer to:
 Washington State University Press
 Wayne State University Press

See also
WSU (disambiguation)